Timo Furuholm (born 11 October 1987) is a Finnish former professional football forward. Furuholm was born in Pori, Finland where he started his senior career in local FC Jazz. He made his Veikkausliiga debut at age 15 in 2003.

Furuholm made his international debut for Finland in January 2010, at the age of 22.

Club career

Early career

In 2003, Furuholm made his Veikkausliiga debut for FC Jazz, playing against FF Jaro at the age of 16. At the time, he was the youngest player ever to make an appearance in the Finnish top flight. In 2004, he played for another Pori based team, Musan Salama in the third level, making 21 appearances and scoring 17 goals.

Inter Turku

In 2005, he signed with Inter Turku. He has since suffered from multiple injuries. During the 2007 season he made 14 appearances and two goals for Inter. In the next season he missed three months because of a knee injury, and was only able to make nine appearances and four goals. The following season he was finally able to play the whole season without injuries, making in total of 23 appearances and scoring impressive 11 league goals. He however missed almost the whole 2010 season as he injured himself in the early days of the season (only four appearances, no goals). The 2011 season was finally his breakthrough, as he went on scoring 22 league goals and only losing by one goal to Kimmo Tarkkio and Valeri Popovitch as the record goalscorer in Veikkausliiga. After the 2011 season, his contract with Inter expired and he became a free agent.

Fortuna Düsseldorf

On 10 January 2012, it was announced that 2. Fußball-Bundesliga side Fortuna Düsseldorf had signed Furuholm, with a contract running until June 2014. A year later, he signed for Hallescher FC on loan, joining his compatriot, Kristian Kojola. He scored two minutes into his debut for the club, a 1–1 draw with Stuttgarter Kickers, and ended the season with eight goals, making him Halle's top scorer for the season.

Hallescher

On 26 August 2013, Hallescher FC made the move permanent and announced they had signed Furuholm on a two-year deal. During season 2013–14 he scored 12 goals and was the best scorer of his team and eight best in the league.

Return to Inter Turku

On 7 December 2016 it was announced that Furuholm would return to Inter Turku.

International career
Furuholm made his international debut for the Finnish national team in January 2010, as he came from the bench to replace Hermanni Vuorinen in a friendly match against South Korea at Málaga, Spain. He scored his first national goal on 10 August 2011 in a friendly against Latvia and second goal on 20 February 2012 in match against Austria. He was chosen for the starting line up for the first time on 25 May 2012 in a match against Turkey.

Personal life
Timo Furuholm is the son of former Finnish footballer and Eurosport commentator Tapio Furuholm. He is married and has a daughter who was born in February 2014.

In 2020, Furuholm started social science studies at the University of Turku. In the 2021 Finnish municipal elections Furuholm runs the Turku City Council for the Left Alliance.

Career statistics

Club

International goals

International

Honours and achievements

Club
Inter Turku
Veikkausliiga: 2008
Finnish Cup: 2009
Finnish League Cup: 2008

Hallescher FC
Saxony-Anhalt Cup: 2015, 2016

Individual
Veikkausliiga Team of the Year: 2020

References

External links

 
 
 
 
 
 Guardian Football

1987 births
Living people
Finnish footballers
Finland international footballers
Finland youth international footballers
Finland under-21 international footballers
Finnish expatriate footballers
Association football forwards
FC Jazz players
FC Inter Turku players
Veikkausliiga players
Fortuna Düsseldorf players
Hallescher FC players
2. Bundesliga players
3. Liga players
Expatriate footballers in Germany
Musan Salama players
Sportspeople from Pori